Holy Water is the debut studio album by American contemporary Christian music band We the Kingdom, which was released via Capitol Christian Music Group on August 7, 2020. The album features guest appearance by Bethel Music, Tasha Cobbs Leonard, Maverick City Music, and Bear Rinehart.

The album was preceded by the release of "Dancing on the Waves", "Holy Water", "Don't Tread on Me", "God So Loved", and "Child of Love" as singles. "Holy Water" went on to become the band's breakthrough hit, peaking at No. 2 on the Hot Christian Songs chart. "Don't Tread on Me" peaked at No. 40 on Hot Christian Songs. "God So Loved" was the band's second Hot Christian Songs top ten single, peaking at No. 4.

Holy Water achieved commercial success in the United States, the album having debuted at No. 4 on Billboard's Top Christian Albums Chart. Holy Water has garnered a Grammy Award nomination for Best Contemporary Christian Music Album at the 2021 Grammy Awards. The album won the GMA Dove Award Pop/Contemporary Album of the Year at the 2021 GMA Dove Awards.

Release and promotion

Singles
"Dancing on the Waves" was released as the first single from the album on August 16, 2019. "Holy Water" was released on September 13, 2019, as the second single from the album. The song was the band's breakthrough hit single, peaking at number six on the US Bubbling Under Hot 100 Singles chart, number two on Hot Christian Songs chart, and number one on Christian Airplay. On April 24, 2020, "Don't Tread on Me" was released as the third single from the album. "Don't Tread on Me" peaked at number 40 on the Hot Christian Songs Chart. "God So Loved" was released as the fourth single from the album on May 29, 2020. "God So Loved" peaked at number five on Hot Christian Songs chart, and number one on the Christian Airplay chart.

Promotional singles
On July 3, 2020, We the Kingdom released "Child of Love" as the first promotional single from the album, concurrently launching the album's pre-order. "No Doubt About It" was released as the second promotional single from the album on July 24, 2020.

Reception

Critical response

In a positive review from 365 Days of Inspiring Media, Joshua Andre lauded We the Kingdom for being "extremely good" on their debut project, and remarked the band "is probably the most energetic band since Rend Collective." CCM Magazine's Ross Cluver gave a favourable review of the album, describing it as "one of the strongest worship projects so far this year." NewReleaseToday's Grace Chaves praised the album, describing it as "fresh and different" compared to other worship albums, and the overall impact being "powerful and beautiful in so many ways." Jesus Freak Hideout's Alex Caldwell says in his four star review: "Holy Water is a refreshing album for these troubled times, and a reminder that the author of all things created music in all of its forms."

Accolades

Commercial performance
In the United States, Holy Water debuted at number four on the Billboard's Top Christian Albums Chart dated August 22, 2020. concurrently debuting and on the Top Album Sales at No. 55.

Track listing
All songs were written by We the Kingdom (Ed Cash, Scott Cash, Franni Cash, Andrew Bergthold and Martin Cash), except where noted. 

 Songwriting credits adapted from PraiseCharts.

Charts

Weekly charts

Year-end charts

Release history

References

External links
  on PraiseCharts

2020 debut albums
We the Kingdom albums